Adam Tilander (born September 18, 1998) is a Swedish ice hockey defenceman. He is currently playing with the North Bay Battalion of the Ontario Hockey League (OHL).

On February 14, 2015, Tilander made his Swedish Hockey League debut playing only one game with Skellefteå AIK during the 2014–15 SHL season.

References

External links

1998 births
Living people
Skellefteå AIK players
Swedish ice hockey defencemen
Swedish expatriate ice hockey players in Canada
North Bay Battalion players
People from Skövde Municipality
Sportspeople from Västra Götaland County